Willem Jan Pluim (born 4 January 1989) is a Dutch professional footballer who plays as an attacking midfielder for Liga 1 club PSM Makassar.

Career
In 2008, Pluim broke through to the senior team of Vitesse after progressing through the youth academy. After making 36 appearances for the first team, the club sent him on a six-month loan in January 2011 to Roda JC, who secured an option to buy. The club triggered the option on 1 July 2011, signing him to a three-year contract.

Pluim was sent on a season-long loan to Zwolle for the 2012–13 season. After returning to Roda JC, he suffered relegation to the Eerste Divisie with the team in May 2014. On 2 February 2015, Pluim's contract with Roda JC was terminated by mutual agreement.

Pluim signed a one-and-a-half year contract with Willem II on 4 February 2015. He made his debut ten days later as a 60th minute substitute for Robert Braber, in a competition match against Vitesse, which ended in a 2–0 loss. Pluim made eight appearances for Willem II for the remainder of the season, but did not appear in the plans of then head coach Jurgen Streppel in the following season. The club subsequently terminated his contract on 31 August 2015.

In December 2015, Pluim signed a one-year contract with Becamex Bình Dương in Vietnam. Without him making an appearance, the club won the Vietnamese National Football Super Cup. On 23 February 2016, it was announced that Pluim had left the club without having made a single appearance. In August 2016, he started playing for Indonesian club PSM Makassar. The club won the cup title for the first time.

Honours
PSM Makassar
 Piala Indonesia: 2019

Individual
Liga 1 Team of the Season: 2017, 2018

References

External links
 

1989 births
Living people
Sportspeople from Zwolle
Association football midfielders
Dutch footballers
Dutch expatriate footballers
SBV Vitesse players
Roda JC Kerkrade players
PEC Zwolle players
Willem II (football club) players
Becamex Binh Duong FC players
V.League 1 players
PSM Makassar players
Eredivisie players
Eerste Divisie players
Liga 1 (Indonesia) players
Expatriate footballers in Vietnam
Expatriate footballers in Indonesia
Dutch expatriate sportspeople in Indonesia
Dutch expatriate sportspeople in Vietnam
Footballers from Overijssel